Plesiocystiscus luiscarlosi is a species of sea snail, a marine gastropod mollusk, in the family Cystiscidae.

Description
The length of the shell attains 1.85 mm.

Distribution
This marine species occurs off Mozambique.

References

luiscarlosi
Gastropods described in 2010